Irvin Juan Soskoy (born December 14, 1992) is an Indonesian footballer who currently plays for Persidafon Dafonsoro.

References

External links

1992 births
Association football midfielders
Living people
Indonesian footballers
Papuan sportspeople
Liga 1 (Indonesia) players
Persidafon Dafonsoro players